The 1976 Cal State Los Angeles Diablos football team represented California State University, Los Angeles as an independent during the 1976 NCAA Division II football season. Cal State Los Angeles dropped out of the California Collegiate Athletic Association (CCAA) at the end of the 1975 season due to financial pressures. Led by first-year head coach Ron Hull, the Diablos compiled a record of 5–3–1. The team outscored its opponents 170 to 119 for the season. The Diablos played home games at Campus Field in Los Angeles.

Schedule

References

Cal State Los Angeles
Cal State Los Angeles Diablos football seasons
Cal State Los Angeles Diablos football